Asmussia murchisoniana was a Devonian crustacean of the class Branchiopoda. It was probably a filter feeder or a scavenger.

References

Prehistoric crustaceans
Spinicaudata
Devonian animals
Late Devonian animals
Crustaceans described in 1859
Fossil taxa described in 1859